Amadou Ba (born 17 May 1961) is a Senegalese politician. He was appointed prime minister of Senegal on 17 September 2022. He served as the Foreign Minister of Senegal from 2019–2020. He was Minister of Finance and Economy from 2013–2019.

Ba was cited as one of the Top 100 most influential Africans by New African magazine in 2011, 2012 and 2013.

Early life and education 
After achieving a technical baccalauréat in management in 1980, Ba received a master's degree in economic science, focusing on corporate management and a diploma of taxes and estates from the National School of Administration and Magistrature (ENAM) in 1988.

Career 
Ba was a trainee inspector in Diourbel in 1989, then Chief Inspector of the first division of value-added tax at the General Directorate of Taxes and Estates (DGID) in Dakar. In 1991 he undertook further training at the Institut international d'administration publique in Paris and in Baltimore.

From 1990 to 1992, Ba was Head Inspector for Dakar-Plateau, then held the position of Controlling Commissioner of Insurance at the Directorate of Insurance until 1994, and then Verifying Inspector at the Directorate of Verification and Fiscal Investigations.

In 2004 he was Director of Taxes for a year. In November of the same year, he was named Director-General of Taxes and Estates. During his tenure, a new  was begun, which entered into force in January 2013.

Alongside these roles, Ba taught at ENAM in the taxes and estates department from 1992 and at COFEB/BCEAO from 1995 to 2000.

When Aminata Touré became prime minister on 2 September 2013, Ba was appointed Minister of Finance and Economy, replacing Amadou Kane. He retained this position when Mohammed Dionne took over as prime minister in 2014.

Other activities
 African Development Bank (AfDB), Ex-Officio Member of the Board of Governors (since 2013)
 International Monetary Fund (IMF), Ex-Officio Member of the Board of Governors (since 2013)
 Multilateral Investment Guarantee Agency (MIGA), World Bank Group, Ex-Officio Member of the Board of Governors (since 2013)
 World Bank, Ex-Officio Member of the Board of Governors (since 2013)

Personal life 
Ba is married and has three children.

References 

1961 births
Foreign ministers of Senegal
Finance ministers of Senegal
Economy ministers of Senegal
Living people
Prime Ministers of Senegal